Kathryn Louise "Kath" Johnson (born 21 January 1967 in King's Lynn, Norfolk) is a British former field hockey player.

Johnson was a member of the Great Britain squad that won the bronze medal at the 1992 Summer Olympics in Barcelona. She competed in three consecutive Summer Olympics, starting in 1992.

She has played club hockey for Pelicans Hockey Club, Harleston Magpies and Leicester.

References

External links
 
 

English female field hockey players
Field hockey players at the 1992 Summer Olympics
Field hockey players at the 1996 Summer Olympics
Field hockey players at the 2000 Summer Olympics
Olympic field hockey players of Great Britain
British female field hockey players
Olympic bronze medallists for Great Britain
1967 births
Living people
Olympic medalists in field hockey
Medalists at the 1992 Summer Olympics